William Brockman is the name of:
Sir William Brockman (1595–1654), military leader during the English civil war
William Locke Brockman (1802–1872), settler and politician in Western Australia
William H. Brockman Jr. (1904–1979), U.S. Navy officer